The Major Archbishop of the Syro-Malabar Church is the head of the Syro-Malabar Catholic Church, an Eastern Catholic Church within the Catholic Church, and the Metropolitan Archbishop of the Archeparchy of Ernakulam-Angamalay in Kerala, India.

The Vicariate was established in 1896, when the first archbishop was appointed. The Syro-Malabar's current hierarchical structure was establish in 1923, and Ernakulam elevated as an archdiocese. In 1993, when Syro-Malabar Catholic Church was raised to major archiepiscopal church, Ernakulam became the seat of the major archbishop.

Bishop of Angamaly
Through the Synod of Diamper, the Latin Catholic Padroado missionaries abolished the All India jurisdiction and erected the Diocese of Angamaly, suffragan to the Padroado Primatal See of Goa, in place of the Metropolitanate of All India.
 Francisco Ros (1599-1610)

Archbishops of Cranganore
 Francisco Ros (1610-1624)
Stephen Brito, S.J. (18 Feb 1624  - 2 Dec 1641 Died)
Francisco Garcia Mendes, S.J. (2 Dec 1641  - 3 Jan 1653) Garcia was overthrown through the Coonan Cross Oath. However he remained archbishop of Cranganore for a small minority of Latin Christians until his death in 1659.
 Joseph Maria Sebastiani (1656–1663) - intrusus as the Vicar apostolic of Malabar
 Palliveettil Chandy (Alexander Parampil) (1663-1687)
 Shemon of Ada (1700 – 1720) - sent by Patriarch Eliah IX Yohannan Augen, he was arrested by Latin missionaries. Hoping to get freed, he consecrated Angelo Francisco, the Carmelite Vicar Apostolic of Verapoly in 1701. But was imprisoned in Pondicherry where he was found dead in a well.
 Gabriel of Azerbaijan (1705–1730)- sent by Patriarch Eliah X Augen, he maintained considerable support among both factions of Saint Thomas Christians.
 Kariattil Iousep (1783– 1787)
 Paremakkal Thoma (1787–1799) - never been consecrated as bishop, but appointed as Gobernador (Administrator)
 Abraham Paulose Pandari (1796–1799) - consecrated by Chaldean Catholic Patriarch Yohannan VIII Hormizd, briefly recognised by Dionysius I and Paremmakkal Thoma in 1799, but never recognised by the Pope.
 Thoma Rokkos - consecrated by Chaldean Catholic Patriarch Joseph VI Audo, achieved limited recognition from a section of Saint Thomas Christians of both factions, received by the Jacobite Metropolitan in Angamaly, however excommunicated by the Pope.
 Yohannan Elia Mellus (1874 – 1882) - sent by Patriarch Joseph VI Audo, consolidated strong support among the Catholic Saint Thomas Christians, but excommunicated by the pope. He led the movement which led to the formation of the Chaldean Syrian Church and the erection of separate Syro-Malabar hierarchy.

Vicar Apostolics of Kottayam, Thrissur, Ernakulam and Southists
Following the schism, the pope having abandoned the latinisation policy, separated Syro-Malabar Christians in 1887 from the Vicariate of Verapoly, the local Latin Catholic hierarchy. 

Kottayam (Changanacherry)
 Charles Lavigne (1887–1896)
 Matthew Makil (11 August 1896–  30 August 1911)
 Thomas Kurialacherry (30 Aug 1911– 2 Jun 1925)

Thrissur
Adolph Medlycott (1887–1896)
 John Menachery (11 Aug 1896 – 19 Dec 1919)

Ernakulam

Aloysius Pazheparambil (11 Aug 1896 – 9 Dec 1919)
Augustine Kandathil (29 August 1911 - 10 January 1956)

Kottayam (Southists)

 Matthew Makil (30 August 1911– 26 January 1914)

Archbishop of Ernakulam
 Augustine Kandathil (1923 - 1956)

Archbishops of Ernakulam and Changanacherry

Changanacherry
 Mathew Kavukattu (Archbishop: 1956 –9 October 1969)
 Antony Padiyara (14 Jun 1970 –23 Apr 1985)
 Joseph Powathil (5 Nov 1985 – 22 Jan 2007)

Ernakulam
 Joseph Parecattil (20 July 1956 - 30 January 1984)
 Antony Padiyara (23 April 1985 – 16 Dec 1992)

Major Archbishops of Ernakulam-Angamaly 
 Antony Padiyara (1992–1997)
 Varkey Vithayathil (1997–2011)
 George Alencherry (2011–present)

References

External links
 Archdiocese of Ernakulam-Angamaly

 
Syro-Malabar Catholic Archbishops of Ernakulam-Angamaly